Hlukhiv may refer to

Hlukhiv, a city in Sumy Oblast, Ukraine
Hlukhiv (village), a village in Lviv Obvlast, Uklraine
Hlukhiv Pershii, a village in Zhytomyr Oblast, Ukraine
Hlukhiv Drugii, a village in Zhytomyr Oblast, Ukraine